Caemorgan is a road (Heol) in Ceredigion, Wales. It means Morgans Field and is the name of the road outside Cardigan off the A487.  This road has a Mansion named Caemorgan Mansion to which Caemorgan Cottage is attached.

Villages in Ceredigion